Educated Horses is the third studio album by American musician Rob Zombie, released on March 28, 2006, by Geffen. A streaming "listening party" was held on MP3.com starting March 22, 2006, which caused advance copies to spread throughout P2P software programs. It is the first album to feature guitarist John 5 and drummer Tommy Clufetos, and the last to feature bassist Blasko.

In response to questions about what the album's title means, Rob Zombie said:
"It was a weird kind of phrase, like, that I remembered as something as a kid. You know, my parents, my grandparents, my aunts and uncles, the whole family, were involved in carnival business and, like, circus business, so as a kid, we would get dragged to these things, and we'd have to spend all this time there. And that was just one of the attractions I remember, what they would call the trained animals, you know, educated horses."

Production
Educated Horses can be described as Zombie's most experimental album to date. Writing for Rob Zombie for the first time, John 5 experimented with a number of acoustics, which can be heard on tracks such as "Sawdust in the Blood" and "Death of It All". Yet the album still contains his signature horror tastes. "17 Year Locust" and "The Scorpion Sleeps" were both written about creepy-crawlies.

Rob Zombie has stated that the album had influences from glam rock artists like Slade, T. Rex, and Gary Glitter.

Reception
The album debuted at number five on the U.S. Billboard 200, Zombie's highest chart position since Hellbilly Deluxe, selling about 120,000 copies in its first week. It also debuted at number one on Billboard's Top Rock Albums chart. In its second week it dropped to number fourteen, selling a further 46,720 copies.

The song "The Lords of Salem" was nominated for the Grammy for Best Hard Rock Performance of 2008.

Christian Hoard of Rolling Stone magazine had this to say:

Music videos
Zombie directed music videos for "Foxy Foxy" and "American Witch". Artist and animator David Hartman created two animated music videos, for "American Witch" and "The Lords of Salem".

Track listing
All songs written by Rob Zombie, John 5 and Scott Humphrey unless otherwise noted.

Personnel

Musicians
 Rob Zombie – vocals, lyrics
 John 5 – guitars, additional bass, background vocals
 Blasko – bass, background vocals
 Tommy Clufetos – drums, background vocals
 Scott Humphrey – additional guitars, additional bass, background vocals
 Tommy Lee – additional drums
 Josh Freese – additional drums
 Audrey Wiechman – background vocals

Production
 Scott Humphrey – producer, mixing
 Rob Zombie – producer
 Tom Baker – mastering
 Chris Baseford – engineer
 Todd Harapiak – assistant engineer
 Will Thompson – assistant engineer
 Rob Zombie – art direction, package design, additional photos
 Kristin Burns – photos
 Drew Fitgerald – art direction

Chart positions

Album

Singles

References

Rob Zombie albums
2006 albums
Geffen Records albums
Albums produced by Rob Zombie
Albums produced by Scott Humphrey